The School of Computer Science is an academic unit located within the College of Computing at the Georgia Institute of Technology (Georgia Tech). It conducts both research and teaching activities related to computer science at the undergraduate and graduate levels. These activities focus on the roots of the computing discipline, including mathematical foundations and system building principles and practices.

History
The School of Computer Science was formed in February 2007, when the former Computing Science and Systems Division was renamed and promoted to "School" status. Ellen Zegura was appointed as the school's first chair. Along with its sibling academic unit, the School of Interactive Computing, the School of Computer Science represents the first time a college-level computing program has delineated the field into separate but related bodies of study. In July 2012, Lance Fortnow, formerly at Northwestern University, replaced Zegura as school chair. During Fornow's time as chair, the number of pre-tenure faculty in the school more than doubled, and the total faculty grew to 37 members. Fortnow departed his role as chair in 2019 to accept a position as Dean of Science at the Illinois Institute of Technology. Mostafa Ammar served as interim chair until Vivek Sarkar was named school chair in July 2020.

Degrees offered
The School of Computer Science offers bachelor's degrees, master's degrees, and doctoral degrees in several fields. These degrees are technically granted by the School's parent organization, the Georgia Tech College of Computing, and often awarded in conjunction with other academic units within Georgia Tech.

Doctoral degrees
 Ph.D. in Computer Science
 Ph.D. in Bioengineering
 Ph.D. in Bioinformatics
 Ph.D. in Algorithms, Combinatorics & Optimization

Master's degrees
 M.S. in Computer Science
 M.S. in Bioengineering
 M.S. in Information Security

Bachelor's degrees
 B.S. in Computer Science

Notable faculty

 Tom Conte
 Lance Fortnow
 Richard J. Lipton
 Ralph Merkle
 Dana Randall
 Vijay Vazirani
 Karsten Schwan
 Santosh Vempala

Location

The School of Computer Science's administrative offices were located in the College of Computing Building on Georgia Tech's Central Campus. Additionally, many College of Computing faculty and graduate students had offices in this building until recently. In 2006, the Klaus Advanced Computing Building, donated by Georgia Tech alum Chris Klaus, was completed to provide additional offices, laboratories, and classrooms for the College of Computing. All of the School of Computer Science personnel have since moved to the second and third floor of the Klaus Building.

See also
 Georgia Institute of Technology College of Computing
 GVU Center

References

External links 
 Georgia Institute of Technology School of Computer Science

School of Computer Science
Computer science departments in the United States
Educational institutions established in 2007
2007 establishments in Georgia (U.S. state)